Salvia dentata is a perennial shrub with short twiggy branches native to western South Africa just north of Cape Town, growing between  elevation on dry hillsides, slopes, and streambeds. It was first described by William Aiton in 1789.

The aromatic gray-green leathery leaves are small and tightly packed. The short  inflorescence is tightly packed with whorls of  flowers that range in color from pale blue to light lavender. As the calyces age they expand and turn pink, complementing the color of the flowers.

Notes

dentata
Flora of the Cape Provinces